The Loire is a river in east-central France.

Loire may also refer to:

Places
 Loiré, a commune in western France
Six French departments get their name from the river:
 Loire (department)
 Indre-et-Loire
 Haute-Loire
 Loire-Atlantique
 Maine-et-Loire
 Saône-et-Loire

Other uses
 Loire Mk, a French army tank
 Loire Aviation, a French aircraft manufacturer of the 1920s–1930s
 French ship Loire, various ships of the French navy
 Loire (musician), an American vocalist